Burt is a hamlet  in the town of Newfane in Niagara County, New York, United States.

It is the hometown of former University of Michigan men's basketball and former Cleveland Cavaliers head coach John Beilein.

References

Hamlets in New York (state)
Hamlets in Niagara County, New York